Songs from Before may refer to:

 Songs from Before (Fionnuala Sherry album)
 Songs from Before (Max Richter album)